The Office of Federal Contract Compliance Programs (OFCCP) is part of the U.S. Department of Labor. OFCCP is responsible for ensuring that employers doing business with the Federal government comply with the laws and regulations requiring nondiscrimination. This mission is based on the underlying principle that employment opportunities generated by Federal dollars should be available to all Americans on an equitable and fair basis.

Statutes and Executive Orders
OFCCP administers and enforces three equal employment opportunity laws: Executive Order 11246, as amended; Section 503 of the Rehabilitation Act of 1973, as amended; and the Vietnam Era Veterans' Readjustment Assistance Act of 1974, as amended, 38 U.S.C. § 4212 (VEVRAA).  Collectively, these laws make it illegal for contractors and subcontractors doing business with the federal government to discriminate in employment because of race, color, religion, sex, sexual orientation, gender identity, national origin, disability, or status as a protected veteran.  In addition, contractors and subcontractors are prohibited from discriminating against applicants or employees because they inquire about, discuss, or disclose their compensation or that of others, subject to certain limitations. Its regulations can be found at CFR Title 41 Chapter 60: Public Contracts and Property Management.

Agency history

OFCCP, as it is today, was created in 1978 with Executive Order 12086 by President Jimmy Carter through a consolidation of all the Affirmative Action enforcement responsibilities at each federal agency with Executive Order 11246 to the United States Secretary of Labor.

The origins of the agency trace back to President Franklin D. Roosevelt and World War II when he signed Executive Order 8802, preventing discrimination based on race by government contractors.

In 1953 President Dwight D. Eisenhower created the President’s Committee on Government Contracts with Executive Order 10479. The order was a follow-up to Executive Order 10308 signed by President Harry S. Truman in 1951 establishing the anti-discrimination Committee on Government Contract Compliance.

In 1961 President Kennedy issued Executive Order 10925  which created the President’s Committee on Equal Employment Opportunity. This called for people to take affirmative action to ensure that applicants are hired and employees are treated during employment without regard to race, creed, color or national origin.

On September 24, 1965, President Lyndon B. Johnson signed EO 11246 transferring responsibility for supervising and coordinating the Federal Contract Compliance from the President’s Committee to the Secretary of Labor who established the Office of Federal Contract Compliance (OFCC).

Executive Order 11375 by President Lyndon Johnson in 1967 added sex discrimination to OFCCP’s mandate. In 1975 the name was changed from OFCC to OFCCP by President Gerald Ford. This reflected the addition of the responsibility to enforce laws prohibiting discrimination against the disabled and veterans.

Bush era
In 2003, the agency adopted its Active Case Management (ACM) procedures to speed up the processing of Supply and Service cases. This system was developed by then Deputy Director to the Deputy Assistant Secretary, William Doyle.  The system was developed because of a lower number of high profile discrimination cases developed after the end of the Clinton Administration. This disparity was because of slow down in traditional enforcement implemented in 2001 and 2002.

The ACM procedure was a clear signal that OFCCP would no longer be enforcing the heart of its mandate, Affirmative Action. The implementation of the system also caused the agency to start 'creaming' its cases and only pursuing those cases that would produce a compensation or other discrimination case – this was a violation of the NationsBank court case.

In 2005, the agency has recently helped develop new applicant and record keeping regulations covering internet applicants.

Obama era
After eight years of neglect, the agency worked to return to relevance.  This was signaled by the elimination of the Employment Standards Administration. During this time, some believe the career staff lacked competence or were motivated by job security. Additionally, many staff were believed to lack experience.

Contrary to federal law, the agency gave out its annual reviews based on a bell curve. Actual performance did not matter. The top management were all refugees from other agencies. Since it's hard to fire SES employees, they all wound up at OFCCP.

Trump era
The Trump era was a slow hobbling of the agency. At the end of the Trump Administration, OFCCP had less than half the staff that they had ten years before. Initially, Ondray Harris was chosen as the director of the agency. His successor, Craig Leen, oversaw the implementation of Executive Order 13950.

Past Directors
Past Directors

Recent Events
In 2020, the OFCCP lost a $400 million lawsuit against Oracle.

Organization

The OFCCP operates from six regional offices, covering the following states: 

 Mid-Atlantic:  Delaware, District of Columbia, Maryland, Pennsylvania, Virginia, West Virginia
 Midwest:   Illinois, Indiana, Iowa, Kansas, Michigan, Minnesota, Missouri, Nebraska, Ohio, Wisconsin
 Northeast:  Connecticut, Maine, Massachusetts, New Hampshire, New Jersey, New York, Puerto Rico, Rhode Island, Virgin Islands, Vermont
 Pacific:  Alaska, Arizona, California, Guam, Hawaii, Idaho, Nevada, Oregon, Washington
 Southeast:  Alabama, Florida, Georgia, Kentucky, Mississippi, North Carolina, South Carolina, Tennessee
 Southwest and Rocky Mountain: Arkansas, Colorado, Louisiana, Montana, New Mexico, North Dakota, Oklahoma, South Dakota, Texas, Utah, Wyoming 

The national office has four divisions: Management & Administrative, Policy and Program Development, Program Operations, and the Office of Enforcement.

Constituency groups
 National Industrial Liaison Groups
 American Association for Access, Equity and Diversity
 National Urban League
 National Association for the Advancement of Colored People
 League of United Latin American Citizens

See also

List of OFCCP Deputy Assistant Secretaries
Equal Opportunity Employment

References

External links

OFCCP in the Federal Register
The OFCCP Institute
National Industrial Liaison Groups
NILG Conference
Affirmative Action
The Center for Corporate Equality

United States Department of Labor agencies
Affirmative action in the United States